Kallur  is a village in the Arimalamrevenue block of Pudukkottai district, Tamil Nadu, India. Kallur is one of the village located on Aranthangi-Karaikudi SH-29 Highway Road that comes under Thirumayam Taluk, Pudukottai District.

Bus facilities : Approximately every 30 minutes, buses are available to Karaikudi, Aranthangi and Pattukottai, from where the we could reach desired locations.

Train facilities: There is no direct train to this village.

Nearby locations: Karaikudi, Chettinadu, Kanadukathan, Aranthangi.

References

Villages in Pudukkottai district